Kolonaki, literally "Little Column", is an upscale neighborhood in central Athens, Greece. It is located on the southern slopes of Mount Lycabettus. Its name derives from the two metre column (located in Kolonaki Square) that defined the area even before the area's urbanization.

Description
Kolonaki is a wealthy and upmarket district. As one of the capital's leading shopping areas, it includes a number of high-end boutiques from young adult to casual fashion to prestigious haute couture from Greek and international designers. One of its main shopping streets, Voukourestiou Street, is now known for its jewelry.

Museums and galleries also abound in Kolonaki. The Benaki Museum, inside a preserved neoclassical manor house, and the Goulandris Museum of Cycladic Art and are two of the finest private collections in the country. Two smaller museums to be found in Kolonaki are the Museum of the History of Greek Costume and the Theater Museum, both highly specialized in their respective areas. A walk across the street from Vasilissis Sofias Avenue are the Byzantine Museum, and the War Museum of Athens.

There is a plethora of available options for nightlife, including bars, ouzeries, and tavernas. Outdoor seating on pedestrian walks is typical, creating a lively atmosphere at night. The main Kolonaki Square (with the small column) is surrounded by cafes and restaurants.

The Lycabettus Funicular, a funicular railway, links Kolonaki to the summit of Mount Lycabettus.
Kolonaki also hosts two metro stations, Evengelismos and Megaro Mousikis.

Parks & Squares

Besides nearby Lycabettus, the residents benefit from other small parks and open spaces:
 Kolonaki Square
 Dexamini, named after Hadrian's Reservoir. Dexamini has a small square where young children often play football, a playground and a popular cafe.
 Plateia Katsiki
 Parko Eleftherias
 Garden of Megaro Mousikis

Gallery

Notable people 
Miranda Xafa
King Constantine II

References 

Shopping districts and streets in Greece
Neighbourhoods in Athens
Museum districts
Art gallery districts